Malcolm Roy Bailey (14 April 1950 – 14 November 2017) was an English footballer who played as a centre-half.

He failed to establish himself in the Football League with Port Vale, and so went into non-league football with Northwich Victoria and Runcorn in the 1970s. He played for Altrincham between 1977 and 1983, where he won two Alliance Premier League titles and triumph in the Cheshire Senior Cup and FA Trophy. He later played for Telford United and Hyde United.

Career

Early career
Born in Biddulph, Bailey graduated through the Port Vale youth side to sign as a professional in May 1967. His Fourth Division debut came on 21 April 1969, in a 1–0 home win over Grimsby Town. He was only to play once more however before being given a free transfer in May 1970. He moved on to Northwich Victoria of the Northern Premier League, and then switched to league rivals Runcorn.

Altrincham
Bailey signed with Altrincham, also of the Northern Premier League, for the 1977–78 season, and formed a partnership with John Owens. In his first season, he scored the winning goal against former club Runcorn that booked "Alty" a place in the 1978 FA Trophy Final. In the final, Altrincham beat Leatherhead 3–1. The following season the club finished second in the Northern Premier League, and Bailey played in the FA Cup against Tottenham Hotspur at White Hart Lane, but missed the replay due to injury. In the 1979–80 campaign he helped the club to claim the inaugural Alliance Premier League title and the third round of the FA Cup. The following season he picked up his second championship medal, though he began to miss an increasing amount of games due to injury. The next season he helped the club to reach the 1982 FA Trophy final and to lift the Cheshire Senior Cup. He struggled with injury at Moss Lane, though still managed to make 262 appearances for the club, scoring 20 goals.

Later career
Bailey signed with Telford United, also of the Alliance Premier League, for the 1983–84 campaign. He signed for Hyde United in 1984, making his debut in a 4–1 win over Southport. He spent just half a season with the club, making 21 appearances in all competitions.

Personal life
As well as his footballing career, Bailey worked in the engineering trade. His son, Michael (born 1985), also played for Altrincham.

Career statistics

Honours
Altrincham
FA Trophy: 1978; runner-up: 1982
Alliance Premier League: 1979–80 & 1980–81
Conference League Cup runner-up: 1980
Cheshire Senior Cup: 1982

References

1950 births
2017 deaths
People from Biddulph
English footballers
Association football defenders
Port Vale F.C. players
Northwich Victoria F.C. players
Runcorn F.C. Halton players
Altrincham F.C. players
Telford United F.C. players
Hyde United F.C. players
English Football League players
Northern Premier League players
National League (English football) players